Inskip alludes to the following:

Inskip, Lancashire, a village in England
RNAS Inskip (HMS Nightjar), a Royal Navy installation near Inskip, Lancashire, England
Inskip, California, a small town in the United States
Inskip Peninsula in Queensland, Australia
Inskip (surname)